Gardens for Health International (GHI) is an American-based 501(c)(3) non-profit organization that seeks to provide sustainable agricultural solutions to chronic childhood malnutrition. GHI partners with rural health centers in Rwanda to equip families with the seeds, skills, and support necessary to shift the paradigm of food aid from dependency to prevention and self-sufficiency.

History
GHI was founded in 2007 by then college students Emma Clippinger, Emily Morell Balkin, and Julie Carney, with the goal of providing lasting agricultural solutions to pressing public health problems in Rwanda. Clippinger and Morell met in the summer of 2006 while interning in Rwanda with the Clinton Foundation’s HIV/AIDS initiative. They became interested in identifying programs that used agriculture as a means to improve nutrition and health rather than solely as a means to increase income.

Carney joined the founding team in 2007 and became GHI’s first country director in 2008, when she launched GHI’s pilot program. In response to Rwanda’s 44% childhood malnutrition rate, GHI’s programming evolved to focus on this particular public health challenge. Under Carney, GHI launched its core effort in August 2010, in the form of a health center program. Through this program, GHI partners with rural health centers with the aim of bringing lasting agricultural solutions to families in need at the point of care.

Carney approached the design and implementation of this health center program through the lens of community-led development. The GHI curriculum and training methodology was created in partnership with mothers that the organization serves, and the organization's agriculture team works cross-culturally to continue designing interventions.

Approach
GHI believes in changing systems, not treating symptoms. Our concept believes that the long-term cure for chronic malnutrition isn’t found at a health clinic, but it can be grown in one’s own backyard. To tackle the root causes of malnutrition, we directly work with families by providing them with seeds, skills, and knowledge to create vegetable gardens, prepare balanced meals, and keep children healthy. Transformative impact is possible by investing in the nutrition of mothers and young children, since well-nourished children get sick less often, perform better in school, and are more likely to escape poverty. With over a decade of experience in Rwanda, GHI has emerged as an expert in the region on nutrition-sensitive agriculture. By partnering with like-minded organizations, GHI has been able to expand their programs to new regions and even refugee camps.

GHI partners with malnourished families to enable them to plant home gardens full of diverse vegetables so they have a lasting source of nutritious food. They provide seeds and engaging trainings focusing on skills such as composting, creating organic pesticides, and other techniques to maximize crop yields using resources readily available to families in rural Rwanda. GHI-trained field staff visit each family in their home, where they collaborate to design a garden that meets the respective family’s specific needs, placing particular importance on increasing the dietary diversity of the household. GHI's home garden design focuses on providing families with the resources that will best empower them to achieve lasting food security by promoting low-risk, self-replicable gardening practices.

They also work to ensure that families understand the benefits of a healthy diet, what makes a balanced meal, and the best practices in breastfeeding. GHI's innovative 'One Pot One Hour' lesson demonstrates how to cook a healthy meal with limited time and resources so that every mother can provide her children with the nutrients they need to thrive. This revolutionary curriculum on agriculture, nutrition, and health topics was designed in partnership with local Rwandese mothers, and the trainings are led by talented educators who come directly from the communities they serve. GHI simultaneously trains health center leadership and community health workers in the prevention, identification, and treatment of malnutrition. Further, the GHI headquarters staff is over 90% Rwandan.

GHI also works closely with the government of Rwanda, which has recognized the organization as a crucial actor in the national agenda to eliminate malnutrition. At the national level, GHI works closely with both the Ministry of Health (MOH) and the Ministry of Agriculture (MINAGRI). In both 2011 and 2014, GHI presented at the Rwandan MOH's National Nutrition Summits.  GHI is also fully integrated into the district-level efforts to reduce malnutrition in Rwanda. The Musanze District Plan to Eliminate Malnutrition (DPEM) identifies GHI as a key nutrition partner and even includes their innovative Child Nutrition Program within their plan of action for the Musanze community.

Programs 
Child Nutrition Program

GHI’s flagship program serves malnourished children under five. They identify malnourished children by enrolling their mothers for a 3-month training. Over fourteen weeks, participants attend agriculture training in their village and health and nutrition training at their local health clinic. Recognizing the complex nature of the problem of malnutrition, these classes also broach often taboo topics such as family planning and mental illness.

MATERNAL HEALTH PROGRAM

Inspired by mothers who said they wished they had known more about nutrition before their children became malnourished, GHI began working with pregnant women in their first trimester of pregnancy. Over six weeks, expecting mothers learn about nutrition and health topics to ensure their wellbeing, as well as that of their newborns.

Partners
GHI works closely with the government of Rwanda, working within the rural health center system, and has been identified as a key partner in a national plan to eliminate malnutrition. Currently, GHI works with four health centers in Rwanda's Gasabo district: Gikomero, Rubungo, Nyaconga, and Kayanga. In the Musanze district, it works with four health centers: Murandi, Gasiza, Shingiro, and Kinigi. GHI provides nutrition workshops to workers at these health centers through the ACCESS project and partners with the Segal Family Foundation to offer training to clinical partners throughout these regions.

The organization also works with the European Union and UNICEF  to advocate for policies and programs that promote sustainable, nutrition-based agricultural practices as well as the integration of holistic, peer-based education into the prevention and treatment of malnutrition. GHI presented at the Rwandan Ministry of Health's 2011 and 2014 National Nutrition Summit, contributed to the National Strategy for the Transformation of Agriculture in 2013 and participated in the 2012 Skoll World Forum and the 2012 Opportunity Collaboration.

Since 2017, GHI has been collaborating with UNHCR and Save the Children. Together, GHI and these international organizations have worked in Mahama Refugee Camp to provide nutrition demos and life-skills sessions. There are plans to apply these trainings training to Kigeme Refugee Camp. The goal in these partnerships is to improve the health of children and decrease malnutrition.

GHI has also developed a partnership with Community Health Workers' community growth monitoring campaigns. With this partnership, GHI has weighed and measured 16,184 to date.

Since 2017 World Food Programme is working with GHI to implement a School Training Guide. These programs train "head teachers" in creating a school garden, with the hope that surrounding communities will benefit from the skills students and teachers learn in these classes.

GHI has also partnered with a Kate Spade factory that employs almost exclusively women in the Masoro District of Kigali. GHI implemented a temporary program called "Life Skills Friday," which women who work at the factory have continued. The women end work early on Fridays to meet and collaborate ways of improving the health and diet of their children.

FULL LIST OF CURRENT PARTNER AND SUPPORTING ORGANIZATIONS

CLIF Bar Family Foundation
End World Hunger
Government of Rwanda
IZUMI Foundation
Kate Spade
Segal Family Foundation
World Food Programme
The Waterloo Foundation
Together Women Rise 
Buckminster Fuller Institute
Eurofins Foundation
Bon Marche Thrift Store 
Vanguard Economics 
Imago Dei Fund
Regenerosity
Greater Good 
Wrong Family Foundation

Evidence of Impact
2018 Impact Report Highlights

 4,919 mothers, farmers, refugees, and educators trained through GHI curriculum
 97,000+ children reached
 2,735 mothers graduated from GHI's maternal nutrition program (double the number of 2017)
 882 families graduated from GHI's child nutrition program

Accolades
Forbes 30 Under 30 Social Entrepreneurs 
East Africa Acumen Fellowship 
Echoing Green Fellowship 
JP Morgan Good Venture Undergraduate Competition 
Clinton Global Initiative University Outstanding Commitment Award 
Staples Youth Social Entrepreneur Competition
Ashoka East Africa Fellowship
Worldwatch Institute Innovation of the Month
Bluhm/Helfand Social Innovation Fellowship 
Dell Social Innovation Challenge

Social media

 Website
 Youtube
 Facebook
 Twitter
 Instagram

References

Charities based in the United States
Foreign charities operating in Rwanda